Pabellón Pedro Ferrándiz is an arena, designed by Enric Miralles, in Alicante, Spain. Formerly named as Centro de Tecnificación de Alicante, it changed its name in honour to the Spanish basketball coach and member of the Basketball Hall of Fame Pedro Ferrándiz on 14 January 2014.

The arena holds 5,425 people. It is primarily used for basketball and the home arena of Fundación Lucentum Baloncesto.

Main events
One of the groups of the EuroBasket 2007 was played at this arena. Bob Dylan performed at this location during his 2008 European Tour on July 2, 2008.

References

External links
Consejo Superior de Deportes Profile

Indoor arenas in Spain
Basketball venues in Spain
CB Lucentum Alicante
Enric Miralles buildings
Modernist architecture in Spain
Sports venues in the Valencian Community
Sports venues completed in 1993
1993 establishments in Spain